The 2000 Wyoming Cowboys football team represented the University of Wyoming in the 2000 NCAA Division I-A football season. The Cowboys offense scored 170 points, while the defense allowed 393 points.

Schedule

Team players in the NFL
The following were selected in the 2001 NFL Draft.

References

Wyoming
Wyoming Cowboys football seasons
Wyoming Cowboys football